Stagger is the fifth extended play (EP) by American singer Poppy. It was released on October 14, 2022, by Republic Records and Lava Records. It is her debut release on the labels, and first on a major label since 2016's Bubblebath.

Background and release
On March 8, 2022, during the first show of the Never Find My Place Tour, Poppy debuted the unreleased song "Stagger". She performed another then unreleased song titled "FYB" ("Fuck You Back") at the Reading Festival on August 27, 2022. This coincided with the announcement of a four-track EP titled Stagger, which Poppy confirmed in an interview with Dork along with a partial release date of October 2022. In the interview, she revealed that the EP would contain "a couple of fun songs, and one slower song", and promised "more guitars".

Later in the year, in September, it was revealed that the EP would be released on October 14, 2022. It was also announced that the EP would be her debut on Republic and Lava Records. The EP's lead single, "FYB", along with a visualizer for the song, was released on September 23, 2022. A music video for the title track was released on the same day as the EP's release.

Speaking about the EP, Poppy stated:

Composition
According to Loudwire, "FYB" demonstrates a "thrashy punk rock style". Metal Hammer noted "punk metal riffs" on the song. According to Poppy, the song is a "[revenge anthem about] somebody getting what they deserve, without you yourself having to lift a finger". Revolver described the closing track as a "melancholy trip-hop ballad".

Track listing 

Note
  indicates an assistant producer

Personnel
Musicians
 Poppy – vocals
 Ralph Alexander – drums
 Mike Elizondo – bass (tracks 1, 3)
 Ted Gowans – guitar (1, 3), synthesizer programming (1, 3, 4), keyboards (4)
 Justin Meldal-Jhonsen – bass, drum programming, guitar, percussion, synthesizer programming (2)
 Matt McJunkins – bass (4)
 Nick Perez – guitar (4)

Technical
 Chris Gehringer – mastering
 Adam Hawkins – mixing (1, 3)
 Zakk Cervini – mixing, engineering (2)
 Darrel Thorp – mixing (4)
 Justin Francis – engineering (1, 3)
 Alex Pasco – engineering (4)
 David Greenbaum – engineering (4)
 Nik Trekov – mixing assistance (2)

Release history

References

2022 EPs
Poppy (entertainer) albums
Punk rock EPs